A bagman or bag man is a collector of dirty money for organized crime.

Bagman may also refer to:

Bagman (video game), a 1982 French platform arcade game
Bagman, a biochip containing the personality of a fallen comrade in the 2000AD comic Rogue Trooper
Bagman (film), a 2010 film about Jack Abramoff
Sack Man or Bag Man, a bogeyman-figure
Ludo Bagman, a character in J. K. Rowling's Harry Potter series 
The Bag Man, a 2014 film
Bag Man (podcast), a 2018 podcast about Spiro Agnew's 1973 bribery and corruption scandal
"Bagman" (Better Call Saul), an episode of the television series Better Call Saul

See also
Bağban (disambiguation)
Bag boy (disambiguation)
Bag lady (disambiguation)